Coenwulf, Cenwulf, or Kenwulf, may refer to:

 King Coenwulf of Mercia (died 821)
 Bishop Coenwulf of Dorchester (early 10th century)
 Bishop Cenwulf of Winchester (died 1006)
, a Wightlink ferry sailing between mainland England and the Isle of Wight